This is a list of brigades in the Israel Defense Forces.

Current brigades

Active service

 1st "Golani" Brigade - Has been active since 1948 and is part of Northern Command, though currently (July 2014) operating under Southern Command in the Gaza.
 12th "Barak"/"Lightning" Infantry Battalion
 13th "Gideon" Infantry Battalion
 51st "HaBoki'm HaRishonim"/"First Breachers" Infantry Battalion
 631st Reconnaissance Battalion:
 Anti-tank Company / PALNAT
 Engineer Company / PALCHAN
 95th "Flying Tiger" Reconnaissance Company
 351st Signal Company / PALCHIK
 7th Armoured Brigade - Has been active since 1948
 72nd Battalion was in the 1948 Latrun Battles
 75th "Romach"/"Lance" Armor Battalion (Merkava Mk.3)
 77th "Oz"/"Courage" Armor Battalion (Merkava Mk.4)
 82nd "Gaash"/"Rage" Armor Battalion (Merkava Mk.2)
 603rd "Lahav"/"Blade" Armored Engineer Battalion
 Sayeret 7 Armored Reconnaissance Company
 Anti-Tank Guided Missile Company
 35th Paratroopers Brigade - Has been active since 1955 and is part of Central Command (Paratrooper units are named after snakes.)
 101st "Peten"/"Cobra" Airborne Battalion
 202nd "Tsefa"/"Viper" Airborne Battalion
 890th "Ef'e"/"Echis" Airborne Battalion
 5135th "Flying Serpent" Reconnaissance Battalion
 "Naja" Anti-Tank Company
 "Coluber" Engineer Company
 5173rd "Taipan" Reconnaissance Company
 "Eryx" Signal Company
 84th Nahal Brigade - Has been active since 1982 and is part of Central Command (Nahal units are named after types of rock.)
 50 "Baselet" Infantry Battalion
 931 "Shacham" Infantry Battalion
 932 "Granite" Infantry Battalion
 934th "Topaz" Reconnaissance Battalion:
 "Gazit" Anti-Tank Company
 "Sapphire" Engineer Company
 374th "Flint" Reconnaissance Company
 Scouts & Sniper Company
 "Agate" Signal Company
 89th Oz Brigade - Has been active since 2015 and is composed of three special forces units, also known as the "Commando Brigade".
 Unit 212 - Maglan
 Unit 217 - Duvdevan
 Unit 621 - Egoz
 188th Barak Armored Brigade (45th, 188th Armored Brigade) - Has been active since 1948 and is part of Northern Command
 53rd "Sufa"/"Storm" Armor Battalion (Merkava Mk.3)
 71st "Reshef"/"Spark" Armor Battalion (Merkava Mk.4)
 74th "Saar"/"Tempest" Armor Battalion (Merkava Mk.4)
 605th "ha-Mahatz"/"The Crush" Armored Engineer Battalion
 Sayeret 188 Armored Reconnaissance Company
 Anti-Tank Guided Missile Company
 401st Armored Brigade - Has been active since 1968
 9th "Eshet" Armor Battalion (Merkava Mk.4)
 46th "Shelah" Armor Battalion (Merkava Mk.4)
 52nd "Ha-Bok'im"/"The Breachers" Armor Battalion (Merkava Mk.4)
 601st "Asaf" Armored Engineer Battalion
 Sayeret 401 Armored Reconnaissance Company
 Anti-Tank Guided Missile Company
 460th Brigade (Bnei Or/Sons of Light) - The training formation for Israeli armoured forces and is part of Southern Command
 195th "Adam" Training Battalion with Merkava 2
 198th "Ezuz" Training Battalion with Merkava 3
 532nd "Shelah" Training Battalion with Merkava 4
 196th "Shahak" Tank Commanders Training Battalion
 "Magen"/"Shield" Tank Instructors Training Battalion
 900th "Kfir" Brigade - Has been active since 2005 and is part of Central Command
 90th Nahshon Battalion
 92nd Shimshon Battalion
 93rd Haruv Battalion
 94th Duchifat Battalion
 96th Lavi Battalion
 97th Netzah Yehuda Battalion
 Oketz Unit K9 special forces unit
 933rd "Givati" Brigade - Active since the mid-1980s, named after a brigade of that name active in 1948. Is part of Southern Command  (most Givati units are named after types of plants.)
 424th "Shaked"/"Almond" Infantry Battalion
 432nd "Tzabar"/"Cactus" Infantry Battalion
 435th "Rotem"/"Retama" Infantry Battalion
 846th "Shualey Shimshon"/"Samson's Foxes" Reconnaissance Battalion:
 "Dikla"/"Palm" Anti-Tank Company
 "Dolev" Engineer Company
 "Shualey Shimshon"/"Samson's Foxes" Reconnaissance Company
 "Maor" Signal Company

Reserve Infantry
 2nd "Carmeli" (Reserve) Infantry Brigade
 3rd "Alexandroni" (Reserve) Infantry Brigade 
 5th "Sharon" (Reserve) Infantry Brigade
 6th "Etzioni" (Reserve) Infantry Brigade
 9th "Oded" (Reserve) Infantry Brigade
 11th "Yiftah" (Reserve) Infantry Brigade
 12th "Negev" (Reserve) Infantry Brigade
 16th "Jerusalem" (Reserve) Infantry Brigade
 55th "Hod Ha-Hanit/Tip of the Spear" (Reserve) Paratroopers Brigade
 226th (Reserve) Paratroopers Brigade
 228th (Reserve) Infantry Brigade
 551st "Hetzei Ha-Esh/Arrows of Fire" (Reserve) Paratroopers Brigade
 646th "Sky Fox" (Reserve) Paratroopers Brigade

Reserve Armor
 4th "Kiryati" (Reserve) Armor Brigade
 8th (Reserve) Armor Brigade
 10th "Harel" (Reserve) Armor Brigade
 14th "Machatz/Bison" (Reserve) Armor Brigade
 37th "Ram" (Reserve) Armor Brigade
 205th "Iron Fist" (Reserve) Armor Brigade
 263rd "Merkavot ha-Esh/Chariots of Fire" (Reserve) Armor Brigade
 679th "Yiftah" (Reserve) Armor Brigade
 847th "Chariots of Steel" (Reserve) Armor Brigade

Former brigades
 Jewish Brigade 1944-1946
 Kiryati Brigade formed in 1948
 Negev Brigade formed in 1948
 Yiftach Brigade formed in 1948 {Consisted of three Palmach battalions and the 54th Reconnaissance Battalion (Samson's Foxes).}
 500 Brigade (Kfir Formation) - Was active between 1972 and 2003
 600th Brigade active during the 1973 Yom Kippur War

IDF Brigade Insignia

Division insignia

References

External links
IDF Ground Forces Order of Battle at Globalsecurity.org
  at The jpost.com

 
Brigades
Israel